1963–64 was the fifty-first occasion on which the Lancashire Cup completion had been held.

St. Helens won the trophy  by beating Leigh by the score of 15-4

The match was played at Station Road, Pendlebury (historically in the county of Lancashire). The attendance was 21,231 and receipts were £3,857

This was the fourth of five consecutive Lancashire Cup final wins for St. Helens, and what is more, the fourth of the seven occasions on which the club will win the trophy in the nine-year period.<br/ >

Background 

With again no invitation to a junior club this season, the total number of teams entering the competition remained the same at 14.

The same fixture format was retained, and due to the number of clubs this resulted in no bye but one “blank” or “dummy” fixture in the first round, and one bye in the second round

Competition and results

Round 1 
Involved  7 matches (with no bye but one “blank” fixture) and 14 clubs

Round 1 - replays  
Involved  1 match

Round 2 - Quarter-finals 
Involved 3 matches (with one bye) and 7 clubs

Round 3 – Semi-finals  
Involved 2 matches and 4 clubs

Final

Teams and scorers 

Scoring - Try = three (3) points - Goal = two (2) points - Drop goal = two (2) points

The road to success

Notes and comments 
1 * The first Lancashire Cup match to be played in Blackpool's new stadium<br/ >
2 * Station Road was the home ground of Swinton from 1929 to 1992 and at its peak was one of the finest rugby league grounds in the country and it boasted a capacity of 60,000. The actual record attendance was for the Challenge Cup semi-final on 7 April 1951 when 44,621 watched Wigan beat Warrington 3-2

See also 
1963–64 Northern Rugby Football League season
Rugby league county cups

References

External links
Saints Heritage Society
1896–97 Northern Rugby Football Union season at wigan.rlfans.com
Hull&Proud Fixtures & Results 1896/1897
Widnes Vikings - One team, one passion Season In Review - 1896-97
The Northern Union at warringtonwolves.org

1963 in English rugby league
RFL Lancashire Cup